Hogan "Atomic Bomb" Jimoh (born December 29, 1955 in Ilorin) is a Nigerian professional lightweight boxer of the 1970s and '80s who won the Nigerian lightweight title, West African Lightweight Title, and Commonwealth lightweight title.

References

External links

1955 births
Lightweight boxers
People from Ilorin
Living people
Nigerian male boxers